Boldizsár Horvát (1 January 1822 – 28 October 1898) was a Hungarian politician, poet and novelist, who served as Minister of Justice between 1867 and 1871 in the government of Gyula Andrássy. He was a member of the Hungarian Academy of Sciences and the Kisfaludy Society.

In 1991, a street in northern Zugló, or Budapest's fourteenth district, was named in his honour.

References
 Magyar Életrajzi Lexikon

1822 births
1898 deaths
Justice ministers of Hungary